Chrysina beraudi is a species of beetle in the family Scarabaeidae, found in Costa Rica.

References 

Rutelinae
Beetles of Central America